Let's Go All the Way is the sole studio album by American pop duo Sly Fox, released in December 1985 by Capitol Records. It features the 1986 hit song of the same name. The follow-up single, "Stay True", barely cracked the Billboard Hot 100 later in 1986.

The album has never officially been released on CD, despite an unofficial digital remaster release in 2002 by World Beyond Music Inc in the U.S with 6 bonus tracks. The album is however available via online MP3 download on major sites such as Amazon, and iTunes without any bonus tracks.

Track listing

Personnel
Musicians
 Gary "Mudbone" Cooper – lead vocals
 Michael Camacho – lead vocals
 April Lang – backing vocals
 Cindy Mizelle – backing vocals
 David Sanchez – backing vocals
 Evan Rogers – backing vocals
 Tony Bridges – bass
 Blinky Brice – guitar
 Dave Lavender – guitar
 Frank Finley – guitar
 Kennan Keating – guitar
 David Spradley – keyboards
 Alec Shantzis – keyboards
 Johnny Ventura – percussion
 Steve Sprouse – percussion

Production and artwork
 David Spradley – co-producer
 Cherrie Shepherd – executive producer
 Roy Kohara – art direction
 Koji Takei – design
 Tony Viramontes – illustration
 Jay Googe – arrangement (track 4) 
 Bob Rosa – engineer, mixing (tracks 1, 2, 5, 8) 
 Bob Ross – engineer
 Michael Finlayson – engineer
 Steve Peck – engineer, mixing (tracks 2, 3, 4, 6, 7)
 Tom Lord-Alge – engineer
 Acar Key – assistant engineer
 Cathy Gazzo – assistant engineer
 Jeff Jones – assistant engineer
 Jeff Neiblum – assistant engineer
 John Klett – assistant engineer
 Mike Nicoletti – assistant engineer
 Roey Shamir – assistant engineer

References

External links

Let's Go All the Way at RateYourMusic
Additional information

1985 debut albums
Sly Fox (band) albums
Capitol Records albums